The Lake Baikal mountain vole or Olkhon mountain vole (Alticola olchonensis) is a species of rodent in the family Cricetidae. It is found principally on the Olkhon and Ogoi islands on Lake Baikal, in southern Siberia. While it was originally described as a species, Pavlinov and Rossolimo reassigned it as a subspecies of A. tuvinicus in 1987 before reinstating it as a species in 1998.

References

Further reading

Bodrov, S.Y., Kostygov, A.Y., Rudneva, L.V. et al. Revision of the taxonomic position of the Olkhon mountain vole (Rodentia, Cricetidae) Biol Bull Russ Acad Sci (2016) 43: 136. https://doi.org/10.1134/S1062359016020035

Alticola
Mammals described in 1960